Michael DeVinko, Jr. (September 24, 1934 – July 11, 2003), known as Mickey Deans, was an American musician and entrepreneur, and the fifth husband and widower of actress and singer Judy Garland.

Early life
Born Michael DeVinko in Garfield, New Jersey on September 24, 1934, Deans was the youngest of three children of Mary and Michael DeVinko. He grew up in a musical family, playing the piano and accordion.

Career 
He was a disco owner, jazz pianist, and drug dealer. During the 1950's and 1960's, he appeared at the popular New York City nightspot Jilly's on West 52 St. He also worked in Los Angeles, Reno, Miami Beach and the Virgin Islands. He was working as the manager of the Manhattan discothèque Arthur when he met Judy Garland.

Life with Judy Garland 
In 1966, according to Deans' book Weep No More, My Lady, he met the actress and singer Judy Garland at her hotel in New York City. A mutual friend of theirs asked Deans to deliver a package of amphetamines to Garland's room in the St. Regis. He was dressed as a doctor, and he gave Garland her “medicine."

After three years of intermittent dating, they were married on March 15, 1969, in London. Although hundreds of guests were invited to the reception at Quaglino's, only 50 people attended. In particular, Liza Minnelli, Garland's eldest child, did not, saying "I can't make it Mamma but I promise I'll come to your next one!".

In her book Me and My Shadows: Living With the Legacy of Judy Garland, Garland's daughter Lorna Luft writes that when her mother married Deans, she was in the final stages of prescription drug addiction and “was dying in front of his eyes.”

Rosalyn Wilder, who worked as a production assistant at Talk of the Town from 1959 to 1979, and who was present at Garland's wedding to Deans, describes Deans as the “dreadful man who became her husband. … I mean if she put an advert in a newspaper for the most unsuitable person to take care of her, she wouldn’t have had a better response. … I don’t know what possessed… well, I know what possessed her because he gave in to her and he fed her all the things she wanted.”

After the wedding, Deans tried to turn Garland's finances around. He envisioned a documentary and a chain of Judy Garland movie theaters. Neither materialized.

Deans discovered Garland dead on the morning of June 22, 1969. Although many obituaries at the time stated Garland was found on the floor of their bathroom, Deans stated that he found her seated on the toilet. The coroner's autopsy later determined she died from an accidental overdose of barbiturates.

Life after Judy Garland's death 
Following Garland's death, Deans co-authored Weep No More, My Lady, a biography of Garland written with Ann Pinchot. The book includes autobiographical elements of Deans' pre-Garland life and their time together. The book was published in 1972 by Hawthorn Books with paperback editions issued by Pyramid Books.

Garland's daughter, Lorna Luft, recalled sharing a limousine with Deans after her mother's funeral in 1969. He insisted at stopping at a Manhattan office and it became clear to Lorna that he was striking his book deal only hours after her mother's funeral service.

"In a move that takes my breath away to this very day when I think of it, Mickey had scheduled a meeting and wanted me to go along," Lorna wrote, adding that Deans and another man "discussed some sort of business deal" in her presence. "Months later, someone told me the other man was a publisher, and that Mickey had arranged to stop by on the way back from my mother’s funeral to cut a deal on a Judy Garland biography. I don't know if it was true, but his book did come out a couple of years later under the title, ‘Weep No More, My Lady.’ Needless to say, I didn't buy a copy. Mickey Deans. What a putz."

After Garland's death, Deans had a four-year relationship with Rose Driscoll, and they adopted a son, Richard.

He was later suspected in the 1983 murder of his boss, Roy Radin.

In 1985, he bought Franklin Castle, a historic four-story stone mansion on Franklin Boulevard in Cleveland, Ohio, for $93,000 ($ today) and remodeled the home for $2.1 million. Deans relocated to Northfield Center, Ohio, for personal reasons in the late 1980s. After selling Franklin Castle in 1999, Deans lived in Northfield Center, Ohio.

Death
Deans died in Northfield Center, Ohio, on July 11, 2003, from congestive heart failure, he was 68.

He was expected to be buried next to Judy Garland at Ferncliff Cemetery but he was cremated and his ashes were sent to an unidentified man in Florida.

Books
 Weep No More, My Lady  Pyramid Books Edition, &  G. K. Hall (1972), a.k.a. Judy's Story (1974)
 Luft, Lorna. Me and My Shadows: A Family Memoir  Gallery Books (1999)

References

External links
 
 Mickey Deans Obituary
 NY Times Judy Garland obituary

1934 births
2003 deaths
Judy Garland
20th-century American biographers
American male biographers
People from Garfield, New Jersey
Musicians from Cleveland
People from Northfield, Ohio